The Okefenokee Swamp is a shallow, 438,000-acre (177,000 ha), peat-filled wetland straddling the Georgia–Florida line in the United States. A majority of the swamp is protected by the Okefenokee National Wildlife Refuge and the Okefenokee Wilderness. The Okefenokee Swamp is considered to be one of the Seven Natural Wonders of Georgia. The Okefenokee is the largest "blackwater" swamp in North America.

The swamp was designated a National Natural Landmark in 1974.

Etymology 

The name Okefenokee is attested with more than a dozen variant spellings of the word in historical literature. Though often translated as "land of trembling earth", the name is likely derived from Hitchiti oki fanôːki "bubbling water".

Origin 
The Okefenokee was formed over the past 6,500 years by the accumulation of peat in a shallow basin on the edge of an ancient Atlantic coastal terrace, the geological relic of a Pleistocene estuary. The swamp is bordered by Trail Ridge, a strip of elevated land believed to have formed as coastal dunes or an offshore barrier island. The St. Marys River and the Suwannee River both originate in the swamp. The Suwannee River originates as stream channels in the heart of the Okefenokee Swamp and drains at least 90 percent of the swamp's watershed southwest toward the Gulf of Mexico. The St. Marys River, which drains only 5 to 10 percent of the swamp's southeastern corner, flows south along the western side of Trail Ridge, through the ridge at St. Marys River Shoals, and north again along the eastern side of Trail Ridge before turning east to the Atlantic.

History 

The earliest known inhabitants of the Okefenokee Swamp were the Timucua-speaking Oconi, who dwelt on the eastern side of the swamp. The Spanish friars built the mission of Santiago de Oconi nearby in order to convert them to Christianity. The Oconi's boating skills, developed in the hazardous swamps, likely contributed to their later employment by the Spanish as ferrymen across the St. Johns River, near the riverside terminus of North Florida's camino real.

Modern-day longtime residents of the Okefenokee Swamp, referred to as "Swampers", are of overwhelmingly English ancestry. Due to relative isolation, the inhabitants of the Okefenokee used Elizabethan phrases and syntax, preserved since the early colonial period when such speech was common in England, well into the 20th century. The Suwannee Canal was dug across the swamp in the late 19th century in a failed attempt to drain the Okefenokee. After the Suwannee Canal Company's bankruptcy, most of the swamp was purchased by the Hebard family of Philadelphia, who conducted extensive cypress logging operations from 1909 to 1927. Several other logging companies ran railroad lines into the swamp until 1942; some remnants remain visible crossing swamp waterways. On the west side of the swamp, at Billy's Island, logging equipment and other artifacts remain of a 1920s logging town of 600 residents. Most of the Okefenokee Swamp is included in the  Okefenokee National Wildlife Refuge.

The largest wildfire in the swamp’s history began with a lightning strike near the center of the refuge on May 5, 2007, eventually merging with another wildfire that began near Waycross, Georgia, on April 16 when a tree fell on a power line.

In 2011, the Honey Prairie Fire consumed  of land in the swamp.

Access

There are four public entrances:
 Suwannee Canal Recreation Area at Folkston, Georgia
 Kingfisher Landing at Race Pond, Georgia
 Stephen C. Foster State Park at Fargo, Georgia
 Suwannee Sill Recreation Area at Fargo, Georgia

In addition, a 501(c)(3) non-profit, Okefenokee Swamp Park, provides the northernmost access into the Okefenokee Swamp near Waycross, Georgia.

State Road 2 passes through the Florida portion between the Georgia cities of Council and Moniac.

The graded Swamp Perimeter Road encircles Okefenokee National Wildlife Refuge. Gated and closed to public use, it provides access for fire management of the interface between the federal refuge and the surrounding industrial tree farms.

Tourism
Many visitors enter the Okefenokee National Wildlife Refuge each year. The swamp provides an important economic resource to southeast Georgia and northeast Florida. More than 600,000 visitors from as many as 46 countries travel to the Okefenokee refuge each year to enjoy its unmatched wilderness. This tourism supports over 750 local jobs and contributes over $64 million to local economies.

Titanium mining operations
A 50-year titanium mining operation by DuPont was set to begin in 1997, but protests and public–government opposition over possibly disastrous environmental effects from 1996 to 2000 forced the company to abandon the project in 2000 and retire their mineral rights forever.

In 2018, Twin Pines Minerals LLC proposed another titanium mining operation near the Okefenokee Swamp. Over 60,000 people sent comments opposing the operation. However, in 2022, U.S. Senator Jon Ossoff blocked the proposed titanium mine after the U.S. Fish and Wildlife Service warned of severe potential damage to the wildlife refuge.

Environment
The Okefenokee Swamp is part of the Southeastern conifer forests ecoregion. Much of the Okefenokee is a southern coastal plain nonriverine basin swamp, forested by bald cypress (Taxodium distichum) and swamp tupelo (Nyssa biflora) trees. Upland areas support southern coastal plain oak domes and hammocks, thick stands of evergreen oaks. Drier and more frequently burned areas support Atlantic coastal plain upland longleaf pine woodlands of longleaf pine (Pinus palustris).

The swamp has many species of carnivorous plants, including many species of Utricularia, Sarracenia psittacina, and the giant Sarracenia minor var. okefenokeensis. A species of mushroom-like fungus Rogersiomyces okefenokeensis  is found in the swamp.

The Okefenokee Swamp is home to many wading birds, including herons, egrets, ibises, cranes, and bitterns, though populations fluctuate with seasons and water levels. The swamp also hosts numerous woodpecker and songbird species. Okefenokee is famous for its amphibians and reptiles such as toads, frogs, turtles, lizards, snakes, and an abundance of American alligators, including the oldest known alligator named Okefenokee Joe who died in September 2021. It is also a critical habitat for the Florida black bear.

In 1974, two LP recordings of the sounds of the swamp were released as disk 6 of the Environments series.

Recent events

Essentially the entire swamp burned, but the degrees of impact are widely varied. Smoke from the fires was reported as far away as Atlanta and Orlando.

Four years later, in April 2011, the Honey Prairie wildfire began when the swamp was left much drier than usual by an extreme drought. With the drought still continuing, the massive Honey Prairie fire continued to burn at only 75% containment. On April 17, 2012, the Honey Prairie Fire was finally declared out. Thousands of firefighters, refuge neighbors, and businesses contributed to the safe suppression of this fire. Over the duration of the fire, there were no fatalities or serious injuries. Firefighters managed to contain the fire within the boundaries of the 402,000 acre Okefenokee National Wildlife Refuge. Only  burned outside the refuge.

In popular culture
 The name "Okefenokee" has appeared many times in American pop culture, including Walt Kelly's comic strip Pogo, where the characters made their home in the Okefenokee Swamp, and Scooby-Doo, in which Scooby-Dum comes from the Okefenokee as well.
 The 1941 movie Swamp Water, directed by Jean Renoir, starring Walter Brennan and Walter Huston, and based on the novel by Vereen Bell, was shot on location in the Okefenokee near Waycross, Georgia.
 The 1952 movie Lure of the Wilderness, a remake of Swamp Water starring Jeffrey Hunter, Walter Brennan (reprising his Swamp Water role), and Jean Peters, was set in the Okefenokee Swamp
 In 1973, the Okefenokee was mentioned in the Hollywood film White Lightning starring  Burt Reynolds as Robert 'Gator' McKlusky, an illegal moonshine runner. Reynolds reprised the role in the 1976 sequel Gator, also his directorial debut. The film co-starred celebrated Georgia Swamp Rock musician/actor Jerry Reed, who wrote and recorded "The Ballad of Gator McKlusky" for the film.

References

Bibliography

 
 
  This is a readable book from a professional historian that covers the history of the human interaction with the swamp from about 1700 to the 1940s, very good background for those planning a visit.

External links

 GeorgiaEncyclopedia.org: Natural History of the Okefenokee Swamp
  FWS.gov: Okefenokee National Wildlife Refuge website
 Gorp.com: Okefenokee Swamp and National Wildlife Refuge
 Okefenokee Adventures website
 Okefenokee Pastimes website
 Okefenokee Swamp parks website
 Okefenokee Nation website
 Charlton County: Okefenokee Swamp historical marker

Flooded grasslands and savannas
Swamps of Florida
Swamps of Georgia (U.S. state)
National Natural Landmarks in Georgia (U.S. state)
Seven Natural Wonders of Georgia (U.S. state)
Landforms of Charlton County, Georgia
Landforms of Clinch County, Georgia
Landforms of Ware County, Georgia